Devil in the Details or Devil in the Detail may refer to:

The Devil is in the detail, idiom
Devil in the Details (Saigon Kick album), 1995
Devil in the Details (The Poodles album), 2015
Devil in the Details (band), metal band from Omaha
Devil in the Detail (film), 2014 Ghanaian-Nigerian film
"The Devil is in the Details... and the Upstairs Bedroom", episodes 4 of the fourth season of Psych